In philosophy, nomology refers to a "science of laws" based on the theory that it is possible to elaborate descriptions dedicated not to particular aspects of reality but inspired by a scientific vision of universal validity expressed by scientific laws.

Etymology 
The term nomology may come from Aristotle. The '-ology' suffix implies 'order', 'word' and 'reason', and is about being subjectively reasonable or 'logical' as in sociology and psychology. The 'nom-' part implies 'rule' and 'law', and is about being objectively lawful or 'nomic' as in economics.

Nomology of mind 
The nomology of mind is the branch of science and philosophy concerned with the laws or principles governing the thought processes and operation of the mind, especially as defined by custom or culture.

In the mid-19th century, it was described as one of two grand divisions of philosophy, the other being metaphysics, for example:

Nomological networks 
A nomological approach requires taking account of both subjective and objective aspects in a decision. Nomology provides the framework for building a nomological network of relationships between constructs in decision making.

See also 
 Deductive-nomological model
 Nomological determinism
 Nomothetic

References 

Philosophy of science
Philosophy of mind